Tamara Braun (born April 18, 1971) is an American actress known for her work on daytime television. She portrayed the role of Carly Corinthos on General Hospital from 2001–2005 and Reese Williams on All My Children from 2008 to 2009. In 2009, Braun won the Daytime Emmy Award for Best Supporting Actress for her portrayal of Ava Vitali on Days of Our Lives. She departed the series in 2008, briefly returning in the role of Taylor Walker during 2011. In 2015, Braun resumed the role of Vitali as part of the series' 50th anniversary commemoration.

In 2017, 12 years after exiting her role as Carly on General Hospital, Braun returned as Kim Nero, the single mother of Oscar, Carly’s daughter Josslyn’s boyfriend. In 2020, Braun received her second Daytime Emmy for her work as Kim. That same year, Braun transitioned to Days of Our Lives to reprise the role of Ava.

Early life and education
Tamara Braun was born in the Chicago suburb of Evanston, Illinois, to a family of Jewish descent. She attended Evanston Township High School. She was a psychology major at the University of Wisconsin–Madison, and took a summer course in Shakespeare at the Royal Academy of Dramatic Art in England before backpacking throughout Europe.

Career
Braun is well known for her win at the 2009 Daytime Emmy Awards, receiving the accolade of Outstanding Supporting Actress for the role of Ava Vitali on Days of our Lives. She is also well known for her Emmy-nominated portrayal of Carly Corinthos on the ABC soap opera General Hospital, a role she played from 2001 to 2005. As Carly, Braun was featured very prominently as a romantic partner of characters Sonny Corinthos, portrayed by Daytime Emmy winner Maurice Benard, and Lorenzo Alcazar, portrayed by Ted King.

After leaving General Hospital, Braun played the female lead in the independent movie Little Chenier, which was filmed in Louisiana in August 2005. Braun worked with a dialect coach to perfect a Cajun accent, and she altered her appearance by getting a bronzed tan and darkening her hair. Tamara appeared as pastry chef Rose on four episodes of the ABC sitcom Freddie as a romantic interest of both lead male characters. Tamara has also starred in the independent film Limbo Lounge, directed by Tom Pankratz. In 2006 and 2007 respectively, Braun appeared on the CBS hit shows Cold Case and Ghost Whisperer; in the former she portrayed a country singer who helped cover up the murder of a fellow singer in order to protect her career. Additionally, she appeared in the 2007 season premiere of Without a Trace.

In 2008, Braun joined the cast of the NBC soap opera Days of our Lives in the  Emmy-winning role of  Ava Vitali, a woman from long-time veteran Stephen Nichols' character Steve Johnson's past. She left the soap in August 2008, but would go on to win a Daytime Emmy award for Best Supporting Actress for her portrayal of Ava Vitali. 
 
Later that year she joined the cast of All My Children as Reese Williams, her second soap opera role since leaving General Hospital in April 2005.

In July 2009, she landed the recurring role of Renee Ellen on the TNT show Saving Grace, starring Holly Hunter.

On February 15, 2011, Soap Opera Digest announced Braun would return to Days of Our Lives, in the new role of Taylor Walker, replacing actress Natalia Livingston. On June 7, 2011, Braun was let go from Days of Our Lives; she made her final appearance as Taylor on September 22, 2011. In July 2015, it was announced that Braun would reprise her portrayal of Ava on Days of Our Lives, in celebration of the soap's fiftieth anniversary. She departed the role in March 2016.

In October 2017, Entertainment Weekly announced Braun would return to General Hospital once again, this time in a new role. She made her first appearance as Kim Nero on November 22, 2017. She left the role in 2019. The following year, it was announced she would return to Days of Our Lives as Ava. She returned to the role in November, 2020.

Filmography

Film

Television

Awards and nominations

References

External links

1971 births
American soap opera actresses
American television actresses
Living people
Actresses from Evanston, Illinois
Jewish American actresses
University of Wisconsin–Madison College of Letters and Science alumni
Daytime Emmy Award winners
Daytime Emmy Award for Outstanding Supporting Actress in a Drama Series winners
20th-century American actresses
21st-century American actresses
Evanston Township High School alumni
21st-century American Jews